The men's 400 metres hurdles at the 2012 African Championships in Athletics was held at the Stade Charles de Gaulle on 28 and 29 June.

Medalists

Records

Schedule

Results

Round 1
First 2 in each heat (Q) and 2 best performers (q) advance to the Final.

Final

References

Results

Hurdles 400 Men
400 metres hurdles at the African Championships in Athletics